The 2019 Pacific Games men's football tournament is an international football tournament held in Samoa from 8 – 20 July 2019. The eleven national teams involved in the tournament were required to register a squad of maximum 23 players; only players in these squads were eligible to take part in the tournament. New Zealand registered with an under-23 squad.

The age listed for each player is on 8 July 2019, the first day of the tournament. The nationality for each club reflects the national association (not the league) to which the club is affiliated. A flag is included for coaches that are of a different nationality than their own national team.

Group A

New Zealand U-23
Head coach:  Des Buckingham

The final squad was announced on 1 July 2019.

Papua New Guinea
Head coach: Bob Morris

The final squad was announced on 12 June 2019.

Samoa
Head coach: Paul Ualesi

The final squad was announced on 10 June 2019.

Tonga
Head coach: Timote Moleni

Vanuatu
Head coach:  Paul Munster

The final squad was announced on 22 May 2019.

Group B

American Samoa
Head coach: Tunoa Lui

Fiji
Head coach:  Christophe Gamel

New Caledonia
Head coach: Thierry Sardo

Solomon Islands
Head coach:  Wim Rijsbergen

The final squad was announced on 27 June 2019.

Tahiti
Head coach: Samuel Garcia

Tuvalu
Head coach: Mati Fusi

References 

squads